Iris Arnaiz Gil (born 18 May 1994) is a Spanish footballer who plays as a midfielder for Real Sociedad.

Club career
Arnaiz started her career at Langreo. In May 2021, it was announced that Arnaiz was the third player in Deportivo La Coruña's history to reach the milestone of 100 domestic appearances for the club.

References

External links
Profile at Real Sociedad

1994 births
Living people
Women's association football midfielders
Spanish women's footballers
Footballers from Gijón
Real Oviedo (women) players
Deportivo de La Coruña (women) players
Real Sociedad (women) players
Primera División (women) players